Soul Kiss is the twelfth studio album by English-Australian singer Olivia Newton-John, released on 25 October 1985 by Mercury Records in Europe, by Festival Records in Australia, and by MCA Records in the United States. It reached  11 on the Australian Kent Music Report Albums Chart and No. 29 on the United States Billboard 200. The album was produced by long-time associate John Farrar, who also co-wrote four tracks; the cover art features photography of Newton-John by Helmut Newton and Herb Ritts.

Singles
The album's title track was released as a single and reached No. 20 on the US Billboard Hot 100 and Adult Contemporary charts, as well as No. 20 on the Australian Kent Music Report Singles Chart. It is Newton-John's most recent US top 40 pop single and her second-to-last in Canada. The single reached No. 100 in the UK Singles Chart. It was also remixed into a 12-inch single mix, which featured a new Carib-influenced percussion overdub.

The follow-up single, "Toughen Up" (written for Tina Turner but rejected by her), failed to chart, except for a top 70 placement in Australia. A remix by Jellybean Benitez was released as a 12-inch single in 1986.

Critical reception

AllMusic editor Joe Viglione found that Soul Kiss "seems a bit contrived" and called "the album, as a whole, [...] one of the weaker links in Olivia's remarkable chain."

Commercial performance
Although the album was not as commercially successful as her previous efforts, it peaked at No. 29 on the Billboard 200 in the United States, and was certified Gold by the Recording Industry Association of America (RIAA). It charted at No. 5 in Japan; and peaked at No. 11 on the Australian Kent Music Report Albums Chart.

Track listing
All tracks produced by John Farrar.

Personnel

Musicians 

 Olivia Newton-John – lead vocals, backing vocals (1, 4, 5, 9), vocoder (10)
 Marcus Ryle – synthesizers (1, 3–6, 8–10)
 Greg Phillinganes – synthesizers (2)
 Mark Goldenberg – synthesizers (2)
 Billy Thorpe – synthesizers (4)
 Steve Kipner – synthesizers (5)
 Tom Snow – synthesizers (7, 8)
 John Farrar – guitars (1–3, 6, 7, 9), backing vocals (1, 4, 6, 7, 9, 11), Synclavier (2–4, 6, 7, 9), vocoder (4, 9), mandolin (11)
 Lee Ritenour – guitars (1, 3, 4, 6–9)
 Larry Carlton – guitars (2)
 Steve Lukather – guitars (3)
 Michael Landau – guitars (10)
 Abraham Laboriel – bass guitar (1)
 Nathan East – bass guitar (4)
 Carlos Vega – drums (1, 3, 4, 6–10)
 Vinnie Colaiuta – drums (2)
 Geoffrey Hales – electronic drums (7)
 Paulinho da Costa – percussion (1, 4)
 Michael Fisher – percussion (2), typewriter effects (3)
 Jeremy Lubbock – strings arrangements (4, 11), keyboards (11)
 Gerard Vinci – concertmaster (4, 11)
 Tom Scott – lyricon (7), saxophone (8, 10)
 Gary Herbig – saxophone (10)
 Joel Peskin – saxophone (10)
 Larry Williams – saxophone (10)
 Ara Tokatlián – pan flute (11)
 Katey Sagal – backing vocals (2)
 Christopher Cross – backing vocals (8)
 Carl Wilson – lead and backing vocals (8)

Technical 
 Producer – John Farrar
 Recorded and mixed by Allen Sides
 Recording and mix assistant – Tim Wilson
 Additional recording – Larry Brown and Rik Pekkonen
 Recorded at Moonee Ponds Studio (Malibu, California) and Ocean Way Recording (Los Angeles, California).
 Mixed at Moonee Ponds Studio
 Mastered by Bernie Grundman at Bernie Grundman Mastering (Hollywood, California).

Artwork 
 Art direction and design – Norman Moore
 Photography – Helmut Newton and Herb Ritts

Charts

Certifications

Video

Soul Kiss is a compilation of music videos from the album Soul Kiss, featuring the singer Olivia Newton-John.

Matt Lattanzi, her husband at the time, appeared in the "Soul Kiss" video.

Contents
"Soul Kiss"
"Culture Shock"
"Emotional Tangle"
"Toughen Up"
"The Right Moment"

References

1985 albums
1985 video albums
Albums produced by John Farrar
MCA Records albums
Mercury Records albums
Olivia Newton-John albums
Olivia Newton-John video albums